Amateur is a 2018 American sports drama film about a young basketball future star struggling with his personal life in pursuit of his dream. The film was released in the United States on April 6, 2018, on Netflix.

Premise
14-year-old basketball phenom Terron Forte has to navigate the under-the-table world of amateur basketball when he is recruited to an elite National Collegiate Athletic Association prep school.

Cast
 Michael Rainey Jr. as Terron Forte
 Tekola Cornetet as Stevion
 Walter Anaruk as Coach Nguyen
 Sharon Leal as Nia, Terron's mother
 Brian J. White as Vince, Terron's father
 Ketrick Copeland as Byron
 Josh Charles as Coach Gaines
 Corey Parker Robinson as Coach Curtis
 James Siakam as Olembe
 Stefan Frank as Petrus
 Ashlee Brian as Anton

Production
A crowdfunding project for the film, then known as Manchild, was started in 2011 by director Ryan Koo. In 2013, a short prequel to Manchild was released under the name Amateur. In November 2014, the name of the film was changed to its release title Amateur. In January 2016, it was announced that Netflix had picked up the rights to Amateur to finance and distribute the film.

References

External links
 

2018 films
American sports drama films
English-language Netflix original films
2010s sports drama films
2018 drama films
2010s English-language films
2010s American films